Salvatore Orgiana (born 12 October 1973) is a former Italian male long-distance runner who competed at individual senior level at the IAAF World Half Marathon Championships.

References

External links
 
 
 Salvatore Orgiana at FIDAL 

1973 births
Living people
Italian male long-distance runners